An inversion is a chromosome rearrangement in which a segment of a chromosome becomes inverted within its original position. An inversion occurs when a chromosome undergoes a two breaks within the chromosomal arm, and the segment between the two breaks inserts itself in the opposite direction in the same chromosome arm. The breakpoints of inversions often happen in regions of repetitive nucleotides, and the regions may be reused in other inversions. Chromosomal segments in inversions can be as small as 100 kilobases or as large as 100 megabases. The number of genes captured by an inversion can range from a handful of genes to hundreds of genes. Inversions can happen either through ectopic recombination, chromosomal breakage and repair, or non-homologous end joining.

Inversions are of two types: paracentric and pericentric. Paracentric inversions do not include the centromere, and both breakpoints occur in one arm of the chromosome. Pericentric inversions span the centromere, and there is a breakpoint in each arm.

Inversions usually do not cause any abnormalities in carriers, as long as the rearrangement is balanced, with no extra or missing DNA. However, in individuals which are heterozygous for an inversion, there is an increased production of abnormal chromatids (this occurs when crossing-over occurs within the span of the inversion). This leads to lowered fertility, due to production of unbalanced gametes. Inversions do not involve either loss or gain of genetic information; they simply rearrange the linear DNA sequence.

Detection 
Cytogenetic techniques may be able to detect inversions, or inversions may be inferred from genetic analysis. Nevertheless, in most species, small inversions go undetected. More recently, comparative genomics has been used to detect chromosomal inversions, by mapping the genome.  Population genomics may also be used to detect inversions, using areas of high linkage disequilibrium as indicators for possible inversion sites. Human families that may be carriers of inversions may be offered genetic counseling and genetic testing.

History 
The first evidence of a chromosomal inversion was found in 1921 by Alfred Sturtevant in Drosophila melanogaster. Since then, inversions have been found in a all eukaryotes. When discovered by Sturtevant, inversions were regarded as areas of recombination suppression.

Originally, these inversions were noted in polytene chromosomes within the salivary glands of heterozygous Drosophila melanogaster larvae. In 1970, Theodosius Dobzhansky noted that genes within an inversion had higher fitness than those that are found outside of the inversions, although this is an area that needs further study.

One of the more recent models of inversions is the Kirkpatrick and Barton Model (2006), which states that inversions are selectively advantageous by linking together adaptive alleles. This is in contrast to non-inverted regions, which may allow adaptive and maladaptive alleles to be carried.

Also, inversions may be used as detectors for global climate change. In Drosophila melanogaster , a study done in 2015 showed that a specific inversion (3R) may contribute to adaptions to climate change. In the species Drosophila subobscura, researchers have been able to track global climate change by measuring the magnitude and directional shift in chromosome inversion frequencies, relative to temperatures at specific global sites.

Effects on recombination 
When an inversion carrying chromosome is paired with a non-inverted homologous chromosome (Inversion heterozygotes) during meiosis, they fail to synapse properly and inversion loops are formed. A crossing-over within the loop can produce unbalanced gametes. In a paracentric inversion, recombination results in one dicentric chromatid and one acentric chromatid. During Anaphase, both recombinants are faced with problems. The acentric chromatid is pulled to one pole or the other, and the dicentric recombinant generates dicentric bridges as it is pulled in two directions. 

In a pericentric inversion, similar imbalanced chromosomes are produced. The recombinant chromosomes resulting from these crosses include deletions and duplications. The offspring produced by such gametes are mostly inviable, and therefore, recombination is indirectly suppressed within inverted regions.

Evolutionary consequences 
The suppressed recombination between inversion heterozygotes provides an opportunity for the independent evolution of the ancestral and inverted arrangements. At the beginning, the inverted arrangement lacks variation, while the ancestral one does not. If the inverted haplotype is not lost (eg. due to drift), the variation in the inverted arrangement is increased over time, and recombination rate in the inverted region is somewhat restored as more homozygotes are introduced. 

Inversion polymorphism can be established in two ways. Genetic drift or selection can result in fixation of an inversion in a local population. Inversion polymorphism can result from gene flow between this population and a population without the inversion. Balancing selection can also result in inversion polymorphism by frequency dependence or overdominance.  The fitness differences between the inverted and the ancestral chromosome can either produce a stable polymorphism or can result in the fixation of one or the other chromosome. 

Inversions have been essential to sex chromosome evolution. In mammals, The Y chromosome is unable to recombine with the X chromosome, almost along its entire length. This non-recombining portion results from a series of inversions that overlap. Decreased recombination rate between sex determining loci and sex-anatagonistic genes is favored by selection. This causes linkage disequilibrium between the male determining locus and an allele at another locus that is beneficial to males. This can happen through inversions resulting in a non-recombining block including both loci, as is the case in the mammalian Y chromosome. 

Inversions can also be essential in the origination of new sex chromosomes. They can cause linkage disequilibrium between a sex-determining mutation and sex-antagonistic loci and create a new sex chromosome from an autosome. 

Inversions can be involved in speciation in multiple ways. Since heterozygote inversions can be underdominant, they can cause hybrid fitness loss resulting in post-zygotic isolation. They can also accumulate  selected differences between species, causing both pre- and post-zygotic isolation. 

Inversions often form geographical clines in frequency which can hint to their role in local adaptation.  A prominent instance of such a cline is inversion 3RP in Drosophila melanogaster that can be observed in three different continents.  When an inversion contains two or more locally adaptive alleles, it can be selected and spread. For example; in the butterfly Heliconius numata, 18 genes controlling colors are linked together by inversions as together they confer higher fitness.

Nomenclature

The International System for Human Cytogenomic Nomenclature (ISCN) is an international standard for human chromosome nomenclature, which includes band names, symbols and abbreviated terms used in the description of human chromosome and chromosome abnormalities. Abbreviations include inv for inversions.

Notable cases
 Brenden Adams: former holder of the Guinness World Record for tallest teenager. His height is caused by an inversion of chromosome 12.
 An example of chromosomal Inversion in organisms is demonstrated in the insect, Coelopa frigida. This particular species of Coelopa have a variation of chromosomal inversions that allow the species to create a series of physical differences. Individual C. frigida that are larger do not undergo a chromosomal inversion, whereas individuals that are smaller do undergo a chromosomal inversion.

References

Further reading

 

Chromosomes
Chromosomal abnormalities
Modification of genetic information